Apache Directory is an open source project of the Apache Software Foundation. The Apache Directory Server, originally written by Alex Karasulu, is an embeddable directory server entirely written in Java. It was certified LDAPv3-compatible by The Open Group in 2006. Besides LDAP, the server supports other protocols as well, and a Kerberos server.

There exist these subprojects: 
 Apache Directory Studio - an LDAP browser/editor for data, schema, LDIF, and DSML written in an Eclipse-based framework. 
 Apache SCIMple - an implementation of SCIM v2.0 specification. 
 Apache Fortress - a standards-based authorization system.
 Apache Kerby - a Kerberos implementation written in Java. 
 Apache LDAP API - an SDK for directory access in Java. 
 Apache Mavibot - a Multi Version Concurrency Control (MVCC) BTree in Java.

See also 
 
List of LDAP software

References

External links 
Apache Directory Server
Apache Directory Studio
Apache Directory Mavibot
Apache Directory SCIMple
Apache Directory Fortress
Apache Directory Kerby
Apache Directory LDAP API

Directory
Directory services